Durian Durian is a 2000 Hong Kong film directed by Fruit Chan. The film portrays the experiences of a young girl, Fan (Mak Wai-Fan), and her sex worker neighbour, Yan (Qin Hailu), in Hong Kong.

Plot
Yan is a prostitute from the mainland in Hong Kong, living near Fan and her family, who is staying in the area illegally. Yan meets Fan in a laneway behind Portland Street and become friends after Yan's pimp is assaulted in front of Fan by an assailant wielding a durian fruit.

Yan services dozens of clients per day and showers compulsively. After her 3-month-stay in Hong Kong, Yan returns to her family and her ex-fiancé in Northeast China to invest what she has earned. Yan remains in contact with Fan, receiving a durian from her as a gift.

Cast 
 Qin Hailu - Qin Yan 
 Mak Wai-Fan - Fan
 Mak Suet-Man - Man 
 Yeung Mei-Kam - Fan's mother
 Chang Kin-Yung - Policeman

Production
Fan was featured in Little Cheung, a film which also deals with poverty and life as an immigrant. This film also centres upon Portland Street in Kowloon.

Chan became interested in the topic of prostitution while filming Little Cheung in Kowloon, where he met and interviewed various prostitutes. While filming in mainland China, Chan found the public toilets to be terrible and very different. This served as inspiration for his next film Public Toilet (2002).

Reception
In addition to numerous awards, the film has received critical acclaim. Reviews have praised Chan and actresses Qin Hailu and Mak Wai-Fan, and emphasise themes of contrast, urban squalor, youthful optimism, and alienation. The film has been called "deliberate and brooding".

Awards
At the 20th Hong Kong Film Awards in 2001, Durian Durian was nominated for the Best Film, Best Director (Fruit Chan), Best Screenplay (Fruit Chan), Best Actress (Qin Hailu), Best New Performer (Qin Hailu) and Best Art Direction (Tin Muk) awards. It won the awards for Best Film and Best New Performer. It was awarded Best Film at the 2001 Hong Kong Film Critics Society Awards. The film also won the Best Picture award at the 38th Golden Horse Awards, with Qin winning the Best Actress and Best New Performer awards.

See also
 Prostitution in Hong Kong

References

External links
Official Site
Review by Shelly Kraicer
 
 
 Durian Durian at filmaffinity.com
 Durian Durian at letterboxd.com
 Liu lian piao piao (2000) AKA Durian Durian at rarefilmm.com

 

Hong Kong drama films
2000 films
2000s Cantonese-language films
Films directed by Fruit Chan
Films set in Shenzhen